Leonardo Bonzi (22 December 1902 – 28 December 1977) was an Italian bobsledder. He competed in the four-man event at the 1924 Winter Olympics.

References

1902 births
1977 deaths
Italian male bobsledders
Olympic bobsledders of Italy
Bobsledders at the 1924 Winter Olympics
Sportspeople from Milan